The discography of Mexican-American cumbia group Los Kumbia Kings consists of four studio albums, one live album, five compilation albums, two remix albums, three video albums, twenty-two singles and twenty-one music videos.

Albums

Studio albums

Live albums

Remix albums

Compilation albums

Video albums

Singles

As lead artist

As featured artist

Music videos

Notes

References

Discography
Discographies of American artists
Discographies of Mexican artists
Regional Mexican music discographies